Morgan Township is a township in Decatur County, Iowa, USA.  As of the 2000 census, its population was 75.

History
Morgan Township was created in 1850. It was named for county commissioner Josiah Morgan.

Geography
Morgan Township covers an area of 24.69 square miles (63.95 square kilometers). The streams of Caleb Creek, Lick Branch and Steel Creek run through this township.

Unincorporated towns
 Morgan
(This list is based on USGS data and may include former settlements.)

Adjacent townships
 Woodland Township (north)
 Jefferson Township, Wayne County (northeast)
 Grand River Township, Wayne County (east)
 Hamilton Township (west)
 Eden Township (northwest)

Cemeteries
The township contains six cemeteries: Elm, Fugate, Gatliff, Logan, Union and White Oak.

References
 U.S. Board on Geographic Names (GNIS)
 United States Census Bureau cartographic boundary files

External links
 US-Counties.com
 City-Data.com

Townships in Decatur County, Iowa
Townships in Iowa